Pearl City is an unincorporated community and census-designated place (CDP) in the Ewa District and City & County of Honolulu on the Island of Oahu. As of the 2010 census, the CDP had a population of 47,698. Pearl City is along the north shore of Pearl Harbor. Waimalu borders Pearl City to the east and Waipahu borders the west. The U.S. postal code for Pearl City is 96782.

History
Early-day Pearl City had an array of rice paddies and fields that were plowed with water buffalo that hauled a two-wheeled cart. In the early 1880s, Pearl City was the final stop for Benjamin Franklin Dillingham's Oahu Railway, a mud wagon driven by a four-horse team. Lots for a yet-to-exist "Pearl City" went on sale in 1889, after completion of the rail line. Near the outskirts of Pearl City, the Remond Grove, an area where people were entertained by piano, banjo, trumpet, and saxophone performances, was a popular entertainment spot in the early 1900s.

Geography
Pearl City is located at 21°24'30" North, 157°58'1" East (21.408333, −157.966902).

The total area is 14.29% water.

Average winter high (January 28): 79 degrees
Average winter low (January 28): 66 degrees
Average summer high (August 23): 87 degrees
Average summer low (August 23): 74 degrees
Average annual precipitation: 64 inches

Demographics

As of the census of 2010, there were 47,698 people, 14,622 households, and 7,288 families residing in the CDP. The racial makeup of the CDP was 59.57% Asian-Pacific Islander, 17.24% White, 2.71% African American, 0.27% Native American, 1.41% from other races, and 18.81% from two or more races. 7.30% of the population were Hispanic or Latino of any race.

There were 8,922 households, of which 25.2% had children under the age of 18 living with them, 63.9% were married couples living together, 12.3% had a female householder with no husband present, and 18.3% were non-families. 14.9% of all households were made up of individuals, and 6.6% had someone living alone who was 65 years of age or older. The average household size was 3.17 and the average family size was 3.48.

In the CDP, the population was spread out, with 18.8% under the age of 18, 13.7% from 18 to 24, 27.2% from 25 to 44, 23.2% from 45 to 64, and 17.1% who were 65 years of age or older. The median age was 37. For every 100 females, there were 115.2 males. For every 100 females age 18 and over, there were 117.3 males.

The median income for a household in the CDP was $62,036, and the median income for a family was $67,246. Males had a median income of $30,712 versus $28,408 for females. The per capita income was $21,683. 6.2% of the population and 4.0% of families were below the poverty line. Of the total population, 11.7% of those under the age of 18 and 4.1% of those 65 and older were living below the poverty line.

Government and infrastructure
The Honolulu Police Department operates the Pearl City Substation in Pearl City.

The United States Postal Service operates the Pearl City Post Office in Pearl City.

Education
The Hawai'i Department of Education operates public schools in Pearl City, including the Pearl City Complex public schools that include elementary, intermediate, and high schools.

Elementary schools in the CDP include Manana, Momilani, Palisades, Pearl City, Pearl City Highlands, Waimalu, and Waiau. Two secondary schools, Highlands Intermediate School and Pearl City High School, are also in the CDP. Momilani, Waimalu, and Waiau elementary schools and Pearl City High were in the Waimalu CDP as of the 2000 U.S. census, but as of the 2010 U.S. census are in the Pearl City CDP.

The Roman Catholic Diocese of Honolulu operates Our Lady of Good Counsel School in the CDP.

The University of Hawaii–Leeward Community College, a branch of the University of Hawaiʻi System, is adjacent to the CDP, with a Pearl City address.

Hawaii State Public Library System operates the Pearl City Library. Originally known as the Pearl City Regional Library, it began operations on November 15, 1969.

Sports and recreation
In 1998, a Pearl City baseball team—Pearl City Little League (District 7)—represented the U.S. and made it to the Little League World Series finals, where it lost to the team from Taipei. In 2007, it won the Junior League World Series, after winning the West Region, then defeating the Central Region and Southwest Region champions to become the U.S. champion, and finally defeating the International champion (Asia-Pacific Region), Illam Central LL (Makati, Philippines), 6–2.

The Hawaii Hawks won the 2003 Field Hockey World Cup 10–7.

In 2017, a Pearl City youth baseball team, the Pearl City KRU, represented the Pacific Southwest region in the Cal Ripken Baseball 10U (age 10 and under) World Series. This series was held in Hammond, Indiana, which hosted nine other teams from across the country. The KRU team won all of its games in pool play, and made it to the World Series finals, where they lost to the team from West Raleigh, North Carolina, 5-3.

Notable people
 Brook Lee, Miss Hawaii USA 1997, Miss USA 1997 and Miss Universe 1997
 Jason Scott Lee, film actor
 Duke Aiona, lieutenant governor of Hawaii, born in Pearl City
 David Ige, governor of Hawaii, born in Pearl City
 Jordan Ta'amu, professional football player

References

External links

Census-designated places in Honolulu County, Hawaii
Unincorporated communities in Honolulu County, Hawaii
Unincorporated communities in Hawaii